William Christopher "Dabo" Swinney (born November 20, 1969) is an American football coach, currently serving as the head coach at Clemson University. Swinney took over midway through the 2008 season, following the resignation of Tommy Bowden. Swinney has led them to national championships in 2016 and 2018, and trails only Frank Howard for the most wins by a head coach in Clemson history. On September 8, 2022, Swinney signed a new contract extension that keeps him the head coach of the Clemson Tigers through the 2031 football season and pays him $115 million over the duration of the contract. This makes him the second-highest paid college football coach, behind only Nick Saban.

Playing career
Swinney was raised in Pelham, Alabama, and attended the University of Alabama, where he joined the Crimson Tide football program as a walk-on wide receiver in 1989. He earned a scholarship and lettered on three teams (1990–1992), including the Crimson Tide's 1992 National Championship team. During his time as an undergraduate at Alabama, Swinney was twice named an Academic All-SEC and SEC Scholar Athlete Honor Roll member. In three seasons at Alabama, he caught seven passes for 81 yards. He received his degree in commerce and business administration in 1993 as well as a master's degree in business administration from Alabama in 1995. Swinney was involved in Greek Life during college, and was initiated as a brother of the Pi Kappa Alpha.

Coaching career

Alabama
While completing work on his MBA, Swinney served as a graduate assistant at Alabama under Gene Stallings.

In December 1995, Swinney received his MBA from Alabama and became a full-time assistant coach for the Crimson Tide in charge of wide receivers and tight ends. He retained these posts under Stallings' successor, Mike DuBose. He was fired with all of DuBose's staff in early 2001.

Swinney sat out the 2001 season while receiving his contractual payments from Alabama. His former strength coach at Alabama, Rich Wingo, had become president of Birmingham-based AIG Baker Real Estate and offered him a job. From April 2001 through February 2003, he did not coach and instead worked for AIG Baker Real Estate on development projects in Alabama.

Clemson
In 2002, Tommy Bowden—Swinney's former position coach at Alabama— offered him the position of wide receivers coach at Clemson, and Swinney joined in 2003. He also took over as recruiting coordinator from popular longtime coordinator Rick Stockstill. Swinney proved to be both an excellent wide receivers coach as well as recruiting coordinator, coaching ACC-leading receivers and being named one of the nation's top 25 recruiters in 2007 by Rivals.com.

2008 season

Swinney was named the interim head football coach on October 13, 2008, after head coach Tommy Bowden resigned six games into the season. The Tigers had started the year ranked #9 in the preseason polls, but then went 3–3 (1–2 ACC) in their first six games. At the time he was informed of his promotion, he was working with the wide receivers on their upcoming game.

With a reputation as a top-notch recruiter, Swinney was chosen over Clemson defensive coordinator Vic Koenning (former head coach of Wyoming), and associate head coach Brad Scott (former head coach of South Carolina). Swinney's first actions as interim head coach were to fire offensive coordinator Rob Spence and introduce a new tradition, the "Tiger Walk", where all players and coaches walk through the parking lot outside Memorial Stadium about two hours before a game as they head inside for final game preparations. On October 18, in his first game as interim head coach, the team lost to Georgia Tech 21–17. On November 1, 2008, Swinney claimed his first victory as the Tigers' head coach by defeating Boston College, breaking Clemson's six-game losing streak against the Eagles. On November 29, 2008, Swinney coached Clemson to a 31–14 win over South Carolina in the annual rivalry game, after which Clemson became bowl eligible. After a vote of confidence from athletic director Terry Don Phillips, Swinney was formally named as Clemson's 27th head coach on December 1, 2008. In his first game as the full-time head coach, he lost the 2009 Gator Bowl to the Nebraska Cornhuskers 26–21.

Swinney's recruiting reputation became evident when he produced five top-20 ESPN recruiting classes in a row, including top 10 classes in 2011 and 2012. As a result, Clemson was one of only 10 schools to be ranked in the top 20 of recruiting five years in a row (along with LSU, Alabama, Texas, USC, Florida, Georgia, Florida State, Ohio State, and Oklahoma), and as of 2014 Swinney was one of only four active head coaches at the time to accomplish the feat (along with Nick Saban, Les Miles, and Bob Stoops).

Despite his recruiting reputation, Swinney was an unpopular hire among some Clemson fans. Some fans and pundits noted that he had never been more than a position coach. Others were skeptical that Clemson had opted to retain one of Bowden's assistants.

2009 season

During the 2009 season, which was Swinney's first full season at the helm, Clemson achieved several accomplishments. The 2009 team finished the season with a record of 9–5 (6–2 in ACC) to win the Atlantic Division title of the Atlantic Coast Conference. The 2009 season included three marquee wins: a win over #8 Miami (FL) in overtime on the road, a 16-point win over Florida State at home, and a win over Kentucky 21–13 in the 2009 Music City Bowl. Swinney coached the Clemson Tigers to a #24 AP Top 25 final season ranking for the 2009 football season.

2010 season

In 2010, Swinney led Clemson to a 6–6 (4–4 in ACC) regular season. Of the six losses in the 2010 season, five were by less than 10 points and four were by six points or less. The season included close losses to Cam Newton and the eventual national champion Auburn Tigers (27–24 on the road in OT), and the eventual division champion Florida State Seminoles (16–13 on a 55-yard, time-expiring field goal on the road). After the conclusion of the regular season, many fans called for the firing of both Swinney and athletic director Terry Don Phillips. Swinney would say years later he expected to be fired after the regular season ended with a loss to South Carolina. Phillips instead gave Swinney another vote of confidence and allowed him to return for the 2011 season. Discontent with Swinney grew even more after a bowl loss to South Florida made Clemson's final record 6–7, Clemson's first losing season since 1998. Swinney, who was 19–15, entered the 2011 season widely considered to be a coach on the hot seat. Despite a disappointing 6–7 record, the 2010 team featured one of the nation's top defenses and the Bronko Nagurski and Ted Hendricks award winner, Da'Quan Bowers.

2011 season

In 2011, Swinney led the Tigers to a 10–3 record that included an ACC Championship, the Tigers' first since 1991. They earned a trip to the Orange Bowl, their first major-bowl appearance since the 1981 national championship season. During a pre-game ESPN interview prior to the 2012 Orange Bowl, Swinney said, "Hopefully when this thing is over, people are going to be talking about the Clemson defense." The comment proved to be prescient as #15 Clemson went on to lose to the #23 West Virginia Mountaineers, 70–33, conceding an all-time record number of points scored in a quarter (35), half (49) and game (70) in the 109-year history of bowl games. Defensive coordinator Kevin Steele was fired after the game.

Part of Swinney's success the past three years was the 2011 offensive coordinator hire of Chad Morris, who was originally seen as a risk as most of his coaching experience had been on the high school level. Morris brought in a fast-paced, up-tempo offense that shattered many Clemson offensive records.

Swinney was the 2011 winner of the Bobby Dodd Coach of the Year Award, which was established to honor the NCAA Division 1 football coach whose team excels on the field, in the classroom, and in the community. The award is named for Bobby Dodd, longtime head football coach of the Georgia Tech Yellow Jackets. The award was established in 1976 to honor the values that Dodd exemplified.

2012 season

In 2012, Swinney led Clemson to its first 11-win season since the 1981 national championship year, capping the year off with an upset victory over the #8 LSU Tigers in the Chick-fil-A Bowl. The Tigers finished the year at 11–2, ranked ninth in the Coaches Poll and 11th in the AP Poll. Swinney was a finalist for the third time in his career for the Liberty Mutual National Coach of the Year.

2013 season

In 2013, Swinney guided the Tigers to their third 10-win season in a row, the first time since 1989. The highlight regular-season win came against #5 Georgia in the season opener. The Tigers won 38–35. Clemson's two regular season losses were to top 10 opponents, national champion Florida State and South Carolina. The 31–17 loss to the rival Gamecocks was a record fifth straight for the Tigers, the longest winning streak for South Carolina in the series. The completion of the season marked 32 wins over three years for Swinney, the most ever in such a span in Clemson football history. The Tigers received their second BCS bowl bid under Swinney with an invitation to play seventh-ranked Ohio State in the 2014 Orange Bowl. The Tigers defeated the Buckeyes 40–35 to give the Tigers' their third Orange Bowl win in their history and their first BCS bowl victory. The 2013 season marked the first time Clemson had back-to-back 11-win seasons. After the game, Swinney recalled the Tigers' lopsided loss two years before in the Orange Bowl and the team's journey since then. "Hey, listen: Two years ago we got our butts kicked on this field. And it has been a journey to get back. We're 22–4 since that night. And we are the first team from the state of South Carolina to ever win a BCS game," Swinney said. The win was Swinney's fourth victory over a top ten opponent as a head coach. The Tigers finished the season ranked in the top 10 in both polls (#8 in AP, #7 in Coaches), the first such achievement for Swinney as head coach.

Following the season, Swinney agreed to eight-year, $27.15 million contract and guaranteed if Swinney was fired in the next three years.

2014 season

Under Swinney, Clemson had their fourth 10-win season in a row, making them one of only four schools to achieve the feat in the last four seasons. The Tigers started the season ranked #16 but suffered early setbacks with losses to #13 Georgia and #1 Florida State. However, with the emergence of freshman quarterback Deshaun Watson, the Tigers only lost one more game to ACC Coastal Division Champion Georgia Tech, which Watson started but did not finish due to injury. The regular season was highlighted with the finale against South Carolina in which Clemson broke a five-game losing streak to the Gamecocks to win 35–17 in Death Valley. Clemson received an invitation to play Oklahoma in the Russell Athletic Bowl on December 29, 2014. Led by Clemson's #1 ranked defense in the nation, the Tigers routed the Sooners 40–6, holding Oklahoma to 275 total yards and forcing five turnovers. Ironically, defensive coordinator Brent Venables had held the same position with the Sooners until coming to Clemson in 2012. The Tigers finished 10–3 for the season and ranked 15th in both the AP and the Coaches Poll.

Swinney's last three bowl wins have been over college programs that have all won national titles since 2000.

2015 season

Swinney completed his then best season as Clemson's head coach in 2015, leading the Tigers to a 14–1 record with an ACC championship and an appearance in the national championship game. Clemson fell short to Alabama in the title game 45-40 after Nick Saban, the head coach of Alabama, surprised Clemson with a successful onside kick. The season marked Clemson's best run since the 1981 national championship season. The Tigers defeated #8 North Carolina 45–37 to win their 15th ACC championship. Clemson also defeated #4 Oklahoma 37–17 in the Orange Bowl for its first college playoff appearance. Swinney was named Associated Press Coach of Year, Walter Camp Coach of the Year, Home Depot Coach of the Year, and the Paul "Bear" Bryant Award. The 2015 Tigers set a record for single-season wins under Swinney with 14. Clemson ended the season ranked #2 in both the Associated Press and Coaches Polls.

2016 season

On April 12, 2016, Swinney signed a six-year contract extension with the Tigers. Swinney once again recorded a banner season as Clemson's coach, leading the Tigers to a 12–1 regular season record and another ACC Championship, the third in Swinney's career. Clemson posted big wins during the 2016 season over #3 Louisville at home and #12 Florida State on the road. Their only loss of the year was to the Pitt Panthers, losing on a last second field goal and snapping their 15-game home winning streak. Swinney punctuated the regular season with a 56–7 home victory over arch-rival South Carolina, the largest margin of victory over the Gamecocks in Swinney's career and the largest in over 100 years in the history of the storied rivalry. Following Clemson's ACC title win over #19 Virginia Tech, the Tigers secured the #2 seed in the College Football Playoff. On Dec 31, Swinney and the Tigers defeated #3 Ohio State 31–0 in Ohio State head coach Urban Meyer's first career shut-out to set up a rematch of the 2015 National Championship against #1 Alabama. On January 9, 2017 Swinney led the Tigers to a 35–31 comeback win over Alabama to capture the National Championship.

2017 season

Coming off of the national championship season from the year before, Clemson and Swinney looked to fill big shoes with the loss of many offensive starters, including standout quarterback Deshaun Watson who entered the NFL draft. However, the Tigers once again rose to national prominence with a 12-1 regular season record and their third ACC championship in a row. Clemson dominated #7 Miami 38–3 in the ACC championship game and secured the #1 seed in the College Football Playoffs. The Tigers also posted big wins in the season with a 14–6 win over #13 Auburn, a 47–21 victory over #14 Louisville, and a 31–17 win over #12 Virginia Tech. Later in the season, a 24–10 win over Georgia Tech gave Swinney his 97th career win at Clemson, vaulting him past Danny Ford to become the second-winningest coach in school history.

Swinney capped off the regular season with another convincing win over rival South Carolina, 34–10, marking his fourth win in a row over the Gamecocks. The Tigers faced #4 Alabama in the Sugar Bowl for the first round of the College Football Playoffs. Alabama defeated Clemson 24–6. Clemson finished #4 overall in the final standings and were ranked in the top 10 throughout the entire 2017 season.

2018 season

The 2018 Tigers, led by true freshman quarterback Trevor Lawrence, finished the season undefeated and won the 2019 College Football Playoff National Championship, defeating Alabama 44–16. Clemson was the first team to go 15–0 in modern history, which led some pundits to say that the 2018 Tigers are the greatest college football team of all time.

2019 season
Swinney's 2019 Tigers picked up where the previous year's team left off, running the table, including wins over Southeastern Conference opponents Texas A&M and South Carolina. The one close call came in Week Five, a 21–20 road win over Mack Brown’s North Carolina Tar Heels. They won their final seven regular season games by an average scoring margin of 41.7 points, and their streak of six straight wins by 35 points or more is the longest such streak of the modern era. The 2019 Tigers held all twelve of their regular season opponents under 300 yards of total offense, and they finished the season allowing the fewest points (10.6) and yards (244.7) per game in the country. Swinney won his fifth straight ACC Championship (and sixth overall) with a dismantling of Virginia in the championship game (although they were unable to hold Virginia under 300 yards of total offense [387]). The 62–17 final score brought the above-mentioned streak to seven. On December 8, 2019, Clemson was named the No. 3 seed in the College Football Playoff and slated to meet No. 2-seed Ohio State in the College Football Playoff Semifinal at the Fiesta Bowl. They defeated the Buckeyes, 29–23, to advance to the College Football Playoff National Championship on January 13, 2020. They lost the national title game to the LSU Tigers by a score of 42–25.

2020 season
The 2020 Tigers played a shortened schedule due to the COVID-19 pandemic. The Tigers finished the regular season with a 9–1 record with the only loss coming to Notre Dame on the road in double overtime. The Tigers avenged that loss, beating Notre Dame in the ACC Championship Game 34–10 to secure a sixth straight conference crown and a tenth win for a tenth straight season. The season ended with a loss in the 2021 Sugar Bowl, the College Football Playoff Semifinal, to the Ohio State by a score of 49–28.

2021 season
Swinney and Clemson started off the 2021 season with a 10–3 loss to Georgia. In the 2021 season, Swinney led the Tigers to a 10–3 record that culminated with a 20–13 victory over Iowa State in the Cheez-It Bowl.

2022 season
Swinney and Clemson started off the 2022 season with a 8–0 start before falling to Notre Dame 35–14 on November 5. on In the 2022 season, Swinney led the Tigers to a 11–3 record. The Tigers won the ACC Championship over North Carolina before losing to Tennessee in the Orange Bowl.

Personal life
Swinney's nickname "Dabo" was given to him as an infant by his brother, Tripp, who would try to enunciate "that boy" when referring to Swinney.

While a student athlete at the University of Alabama, his mother stayed with him in an apartment off campus after the mother-son team lived in near-homelessness his senior year of high school.

Swinney converted to Christianity when he was sixteen years old, saying, "And that was a game-changer for me. That’s really become the foundation of my life." Swinney has also said, "Coaching makes some of the things I’ve experienced in my life make sense to me. It allows me to use my life experiences to impact young people and to serve God through what I do. I’m very passionate about seeing young people graduate, mature and develop.".

He is married to Kathleen Swinney with whom he has three sons, and resides in Clemson, South Carolina.

Head coaching record

References

External links

 Coaching statistics at Sports-Reference.com
 Clemson Tigers bio

1969 births
Living people
American Christians
American football wide receivers
Alabama Crimson Tide football coaches
Alabama Crimson Tide football players
Clemson Tigers football coaches
American real estate businesspeople
People from Pelham, Alabama
Sportspeople from Birmingham, Alabama
Coaches of American football from Alabama
Players of American football from Birmingham, Alabama